Hyalinobatrachium nouns, also known as Nouns' glassfrog, is a species of glass frog in the family Centrolenidae, distributed in western Ecuador.

Discovery 
Hyalinobatrachium nouns was discovered (along with H. mashpi) in the Andes of Western Ecuador, one of the most biodiverse hotspots in the world. The discovery was published by a team of scientists, namely Guayasamin, Brunner, Valencia-Aguilar, Franco-Mena, Ringler, Medina Armijos, Morochz, Bustamante, Maynard and Culebras in early 2022.

Naming controversy 

The species was named after Nouns DAO, a decentralized autonomous organization, following a donation from the group to the environmental nonprofit Rainforest Trust, which runs conservation efforts in the amphibian's native habitat. This raised concerns amongst conservationists about associating the charity with a blockchain project.

References 

Amphibians of South America
Amphibians described in 2022
nouns